Augmentative and Alternative Communication is a quarterly peer-reviewed scientific journal covering augmentative and alternative communication. It was established in 1985 and is published by Taylor & Francis on behalf of the International Society for Augmentative and Alternative Communication, of which it is the official journal. The editor-in-chief is Ralf Schlosser (Northeastern University). According to the Journal Citation Reports, the journal has a 2018 impact factor of 2.706.

References

External links

Taylor & Francis academic journals
Publications established in 1985
Quarterly journals
English-language journals
Augmentative and alternative communication
Audiology journals
Communication journals